George John Gordon Hake (24 August 1918 – ) was an English first-class cricketer.

The Epsom-born John Hake was educated at Bromsgrove School and represented Middlesex in one first-class match during the 1948 English cricket season. 

He died in Godstone, Surrey on 1 April 2013 aged 94.

References

1918 births
2013 deaths
Cricketers from Epsom
English cricketers
Middlesex cricketers
People educated at Bromsgrove School